The Norwegian Forestry Society (often shortened to Skogselskapet) is an interest organisation in Norway.

It was established as Det norske Skogselskab in 1898, with Axel Heiberg as its first chairman. Its purpose is to promote forestry interests. It issues the magazine Norsk Skogbruk. Chairman of the board is Johan C. Løken, and the organizational headquarters are in Oslo.

References

External links
Official site
Official site, Norsk Skogbruk

Forestry in Norway
Organizations established in 1898
Organisations based in Oslo
1898 establishments in Norway